Saint-Gervais is a village of 1,900 people in the Bellechasse Regional County Municipality, part of the Chaudière-Appalaches administrative region of Quebec, Canada. It is named in honor of Gervasius, martyr with Protasius in the year 57.

References

Municipalities in Quebec
Incorporated places in Chaudière-Appalaches
Canada geography articles needing translation from French Wikipedia